Emily Frederick Clark (fl. 1798–1833) was an English novelist and poet. Several of her novels are set in Wales.

Family
She was the daughter of a customs official named Clark (died 1824) and his wife Elizabeth (died 1825), who was the daughter of Felice Frederick (c. 1725–1797). On the title pages of her novels she made unsubstantiated claims to be the great-granddaughter of Theodore, King of Corsica.

Finances
Several of Clark's novels are set in the Welsh countryside. Press attention to her work dwindled, leaving her to wage a lifelong battle against penury. Twenty-four of her 42 applications to the Royal Literary Fund were successful. Nothing further is known of her after the last application was sent in 1833.

She is one of the "lost" women writers listed by Dale Spender in Mothers of the Novel: 100 Good Women Writers Before Jane Austen.

Works
Ianthé, or the Flower of Caernarvon (1798)
Ermina Montrose or The Cottage of the Vale (1800)
The Banks of the Douro, or, The Maid of Portugal (1805)
Poems (1810)
Tales at the Fireside (1817)
The Esquimaux (1819)

References

English women novelists
Year of birth missing
Year of death missing
18th-century births
18th-century English writers
18th-century British women writers
18th-century English women
18th-century English people